Erannis vancouverensis is a species of geometrid moth in the family Geometridae.

References

Further reading

External links

 

Bistonini
Moths described in 1896